Little Lake may refer to:

Communities 
In Canada:
 Little Lake, Ontario in Puslinch, Ontario
 Little Lake (Nova Scotia) in Nova Scotia

In the United States:
 Little Lake, Inyo County, California
 Little Lake, California, former name of Willits, California
 Little Lake, Michigan in Forsyth Township
 Little Lake, Bedford Township, Michigan, a former settlement

Lakes
 Little Lake (Montana), in Missoula County, Montana
 Little Lake (Peterborough), in Peterborough, Ontario
 Little Lake (Wisconsin), in the Town of Washington Island, Door County, Wisconsin

Other
 Little Lake School District, California